A micronova is a type of thermonuclear explosion on the surface of a white dwarf much smaller than the strength of a nova; being about  in strength, about a millionth that of a typical nova. The phenomenon was first described in April 2022.

History 
A team led by Durham University researchers announced on 20 April 2022 that they identified three micronovae using data from the Transiting Exoplanet Survey Satellite (TESS). The team discovered with TESS that two of the micronovae occurred on white dwarfs, with the astronomers confirming with the Very Large Telescope that the third occurred on a white dwarf as well.

The phenomenon had previously been observed in the white dwarf binary TV Columbae using data from the International Ultraviolet Explorer. However the data was not sufficient to infer the physical mechanism behind the explosion.

Formation 
Micronovae specifically form on white dwarfs that have strong magnetic fields, as fields send material toward the star's magnetic poles. This causes the hydrogen fusion explosions on the surface to be more localized and small than a typical nova.

References

See also

 

 
Stellar phenomena
Astronomical events